This is a List of Nudgee College Old Boys, who are notable former students of St Joseph's College, Nudgee in Brisbane, Queensland, Australia.

Alumni of St Joseph's Nudgee College are known as Old Boys, and automatically become members of the school's alumni association, the Nudgee College Old Boys Association (NCOBA).

Academia, medicine and science 
 Dr Prof John Boldemannuclear scientist, best known for his work on the ANTARES Tandem Accelerator and the Australian synchrotron

 Francis Patrick Donovan 1946 Rhodes scholar
 Neal Macrossan1907 Rhodes scholar
 Dr Harry WindsorAustralia's first heart transplant surgeon

Arts, entertainment and music 
 Jacob Elordiartist
 Ron Grainercomposer
 Pete Murraysinger-songwriter
 Hayden Broughartist

Business 
 Ian Riceproperty developer and former president of Carlton Blues

Politics, public service and the law 
 Archbishop John BathersbyCatholic Archbishop of Brisbane
 Kevin Byrneformer Mayor of Cairns
 The Hon Hugh Denis MacrossanState MLA, 1912–1915 and Chief Justice of Queensland, 1940
 Neal MacrossanChief Justice of Queensland, 1946–1955
 The Hon John MuirJustice of Appeal, Supreme Court of Queensland (retired 27 December 2014) 
 Ted O'BrienMember for Fairfax

 Neil O'SullivanLeader of the Liberal Party in the Senate
 The Hon Warwick Parer Senator and Minister, 1984–2000
 Tom Quiltypastoralist, philanthropist, and bush poet

 Mick Veiversformer coalition government minister, and rugby league football player
 Terry Whiteformer Liberal Party leader in Queensland and founder of Terry White Chemists

Sport 
 Jason AkermanisAustralian rules football player

 Leith Brodieswimmer, bronze medallist at the 2008 Beijing Olympics
 Joe Burnscricket player

 Lionel Coxcyclist, gold and silver medallist at the 1952 Helsinki Olympics
 Michael Cresswellbasketball player for Cairns Marlins
 Rocky Elsomrugby union football player
 Elton Flatleyrugby union football player
 Josh Flookrugby union football player
 Nicholas Halljockey
 Sean Hardmanrugby union football player
 Nathan Hauritzcricket player
 Peter Hewatrugby union football player

 Damian Istria gymnast, gold and silver medallist at the 2006 Commonwealth Games
 Mark Loanerugby union football player
 Chris Lynncricket player
 Paul McLeanrugby union football player
 Jack McLoughlin1500m Freestyle, 2016 Rio Olympics
 Sean McMahonrugby union football player
 Hugh McMenimanrugby union football player
 Nathan McSweeneycricket player
 Jimmy Mahercricket player
 Anthony Martinweightlifter, 2000 Olympic Games
 Matt Moorebasketball player for South East Melbourne Magic and Brisbane Bullets
 James O'Connorrugby union football player for the Australian Wallabies
 Brenton Rickardswimmer, silver medallist at the 2008 Beijing Olympics
 Dom Shipperleyrugby union football player
 Mitchell Swepsoncricket player
 William MartinParaolympic Swimmer

See also

 Catholic education in Australia

References

Lists of Australian men
Lists of people educated in Queensland by school affiliation
Brisbane-related lists
St Joseph's College, Nudgee